Santiago "Cucurucho" Santamaría (22 August 1952 – 27 July 2013) was an Argentine professional footballer who played primarily as a winger.

During his club career he played for Newell's Old Boys (1971–74, 1980–83), Stade de Reims (1974–1979), and Talleres de Córdoba (1984). He played for the Argentina national team in the 1982 FIFA World Cup. In Newell's, Santamaría ranks 2nd among the all-time top scorers, with 90 goals scored during his two tenures in the club.

After his retirement, he settled in Córdoba, where he died from a heart attack on 27 July 2013.

Highlights
In April 1978 Santamaría was the last player to score a hat-trick for Stade de Reims in the top flight before Boulaye Dia repeated the feat in October 2020.

References

External links
 
 

1952 births
2013 deaths
People from San Nicolás de los Arroyos
Association football wingers
Argentine footballers
Argentina international footballers
1982 FIFA World Cup players
Argentine Primera División players
Ligue 1 players
Newell's Old Boys footballers
Stade de Reims players
Talleres de Córdoba footballers
Argentine expatriate footballers
Expatriate footballers in France
Argentine expatriate sportspeople in France
Sportspeople from Buenos Aires Province